Events from the year 1824 in Canada.

Incumbents
Monarch: George IV

Federal government
Parliament of Lower Canada: 11th (until July 6)
Parliament of Upper Canada: 8th (until January 19)

Governors
Governor of the Canadas: Robert Milnes
Governor of New Brunswick: George Stracey Smyth
Governor of Nova Scotia: John Coape Sherbrooke
Commodore-Governor of Newfoundland: Richard Goodwin Keats
Governor of Prince Edward Island: Charles Douglass Smith

Events
The first Welland Canal is begun, partly in response to American initiatives in the Erie Canal.
Russians begin exploration of mainland that leads to discovery of Nushagak, Kuskokwim, Yukon, and Koyukuk Rivers.
William Lyon Mackenzie establishes the Colonial Advocate.
First Lachine Canal near Montreal is completed.

Births
January 4 – Peter Mitchell, politician, Minister and a Father of Confederation (died 1899)
March 14 – John Robson, journalist, politician and Premier of British Columbia (died 1892)
August 4 – Antoine Gérin-Lajoie, poet and novelist (died 1882)
November 18 – John Bolton, businessman and politician (died 1872)

Full date unknown
Philip Francis Little, 1st Premier of Newfoundland of the colonial (died 1897)
Edward Whelan, journalist and politician (died 1867)

Deaths
 January 17 – William Osgoode, judge (born 1754)
 February 9 – Ward Chipman, lawyer, public servant, politician (born 1754)
 April 4 – Alexander Henry the elder, fur trader, merchant, militia officer, jp, and author (born 1739)
 August 3 – Joseph Barss, privateer (born 1776)

References 

 
Canada
Years of the 19th century in Canada
1824 in North America